Dastaan is a Pakistani TV series based on the novel Bano, by Razia Butt. Broadcast on Hum TV in 2010, it was dramatized by Samira Fazal. Based on the partition of the Indian Subcontinent and the resulting independence  of Pakistan, the story takes place takes place between 1947 and 1956. The drama depicts the story of Bano, a girl from a close knit Muslim family living in Ludhiana (located in undivided Punjab) in the pre-1947 era. The story is about the trials and tribulations Bano faces after she decides to dedicate her life to the All-India Muslim League.

Dastaan is the first project of its kind taken up by the Pakistani media. Director Haissam Hussain stated in an interview  that production for the drama began months in advance, and that the filming itself only took a little over two months. It is considered to be one of the best Pakistani television series of all times.

Plot
Built on the true events of partition of 1947, the series depicts the events of rioting and chaos in 1947.

Based on the novel, Bano, Dastaan begins with the wedding of Suraiya and Salim. Suraiya's nephew, Hassan was the son of Rasheeda. When Hassan's father died, he and his mother were kicked out of his fathers house by his paternal family and they moved back to Rasheeda's maternal house. Bano, Suraiya, Faheem and Salim and Hassan were childhood friends and all grew up together. When Hassan went to study at University he left home and went to Islamia college in Peshawar. Hassan returns for Saleem and Suraiya's wedding where Hassan and Bano meet for the first time as adults after three years. (The last time they met was three years ago when they were children). The whole family was gathered for the wedding, including Hassan's aunt Jameela from  Amritsar and his aunt Sultana and her daughter Rabia from Lahore. Hassan spent most of his time at the wedding preaching the Quaid's message and the rest of it teasing his cousin Rabia and flirting with Bano. Although Rabia was only 14 years old and Hassan thought of her as a younger sister, she started developing feelings for him. As Hassan starts teasing and flirting with Bano, they slowly begin to develop feelings for each other, with Hassan visiting Ludhiana every now and then. Hassan is in his final year at the Islamia College as an engineering student. He is an active supporter of the All-India Muslim League, and the leader of the Ludhiana Branch. He strongly believes in the establishment of Pakistan and is an avid follower of Qaid-E-Azam, the leader of the Muslim League and Pakistan Movement. Meanwhile, Saleem is an active supporter of the Indian National Congress, with all his friends being Hindu. He strictly believes that the establishment of Pakistan will not help, but rather lessen the position of Muslims in India. The political debate between Saleem and Hassan begins as friendly competition, but intensifies as conditions worsen throughout India for Muslims. Saleem, hot-tempered and rash, begins to bring political debates into family life and eventually forbids Suraiya to visit Hassan, her nephew. But Hassan is not dissuaded. He continues to spread the message of Pakistan throughout Saleem's family, causing Saleem's anger to explode on many occasions. Other than Saleem, his entire family become strong supporters of the Muslim League, especially Bano, who makes posters and signs for the Pakistan Movement.

Bibi tells Suraiya that a marriage proposal has come for Bano from Patiala. Suraiya panicked and tells her sister Rashida that Bano and Hassan like each other and have become close, and that if they don't get married Bano would commit suicide and Hassan wouldn't marry anyone else either. Upon hearing this Rashida takes her brother and sister-in-law and asks for Banos hand in marriage for Hassan. Saleem overhears this and politely tells them that they can leave because a proposal has come for Bano. Bano's parents become angry and ask Saleem who he had in mind and Saleem tells them for his Hindu friend called Ram. His parents immediately agree for Bano's proposal with Hassan.  Hassan and Bano eventually become engaged, and Saleem decides to leave behind his rivalry with Hassan for Bano's sake. Soon, Hassan gets a job in Rawalpindi and has to leave immediately. He leaves Ludhiana, with the promise that they will return four months later for the wedding. Meanwhile, Suraiya is 4 months pregnant.

During this time tensions between Hindus and Muslims escalate dramatically, and violence breaks out all across India. Hate crimes against Muslims become common, and fighting spreads to all states, getting threateningly closer to Ludhiana every day. As the fighting becomes more pronounced, Muslims retaliate, leaving nobody safe. Saleem seems to be under the impression that his Hindu friends and their families will be able to protect his family from rioters, however, he soon feels them to be distant and aloof, and soon realises that he was wrong all along.

On a fateful night, a group of Sikhs and Hindus attack the family's home.  All of the men (which includes many other Muslims who sought refuge in their house) stay on the bottom floor with their swords and knives intending to fight. All the women (including Bano, Suraiya, and Bano's mother, Bibi, Sakina Khala and her daughters) are huddled on the roof of the house.  All the men are brutally killed while the women are either taken to be raped and killed or committed suicide to save themselves from that fate. Bano and Bibi however survive and are 'rescued' by Salim's hindu friends.

Saleem's friend, Ram, tries to rape Bano, but his other friend saves her by killing Ram out of guilt. Bano, alone with Bibi, manages to escape Ludhiana, where they seek shelter in a refugee camp for Muslims. The Muslim refugees are headed by a young brave Muslim man who lost his entire family. Thirsty and hungry, they try to walk to Pakistan, encountering poisoned wells along the way. Eventually, Hindu rioters attack this caravan. Bano is separated from Bibi and both are gang raped. Bano crawls toward her mother's now lifeless body, seeing her Ta'wiz necklace next to it. Bano, grief-stricken and in shock, wears it and lays next to her body.

A Sikh man stumbles upon Bano and her dead mother, and he helps nurse her back to health. He then boards her on a train heading from Jalandhar towards Lahore and leaves. It was common for trains to arrive in Lahore full of dead Muslims with only a few survivors and vice versa. Soon this train is attacked by rioters. Basant Singh, a rioter, chases after Bano on the train. She falls unconscious, and Basant Singh kidnaps her, bringing her to his home in Kapurthala. She awakens in his home where he and his mother live. At first, she refuses to tell them her name, and so Basant Singh calls her Sundar Kaur, meaning "beautiful lioness" in Punjabi. He gives her the impression that he will take her to Pakistan himself once the dangers are gone. He also tells her she can write to Hassan and he'll deliver the letters. Bano believes his lies and cannot wait to go to Pakistan.

Nearly a year later, Basant has not lived up to his promise, claiming that the roadways are still blocked and that traveling to Pakistan is too dangerous. Eventually, Bano learns of his plans to forcibly marry her and convert her, and she attempts to run away again. This time though, when Basant catches her, he doesn't treat her gently as the first time. He spends the next 5 years beating, raping, emotionally torturing Bano after forcibly marrying and converting her. However she doesn't give up and makes his blood boil by shouting abuses at him  and never forgetting that she is a muslim. One fateful day, Basant dies as he tries to save their infant son Bhagat Singh as he's about to fall from the roof. Bano takes her son and migrates to Pakistan.

In Pakistan, Hassan goes through severe depression after realising that Suraiyyah and Bano along with their other relatives must have been brutally raped and killed. He goes from a friendly extrovert to a miserable reserved person. For the next five years, his mother did not see him laugh. Seeing this, she asks him to get married but her disagrees as he believes himself to be married to Bano. One day, Sultana, his aunt, along with her children decides to visit. Hassan is excited after a long time to meet his only surviving family, especially Rabia. Expecting the same 14 year-old child with ponytails whom he could tease again, he's astonished when he encounters a young woman instead. He becomes distant from her as he can sense her feelings. However its been five years since Bano's 'death' and he needs to move on. Later Rabia and her mother moved from Karachi to  Lahore to meet Hassan and her mother. 
He tries to find Bano in Rabia and soon gets engaged to her.

Bano ends up in a shelter for refugees. The caretaker woman writes a letter to Hassan asking him to come and take Bano.

Hassan receives the letter and takes Bano and the child home. Hassan decides to marry Bano, and wants to break off his engagement to Rabia. Rabia and her mother come to know of this and visit Hassan's house. Rabia's mother tells Rabia to take care of Bano to please Hassan. However, one day, he overhears a conversation between his parents about Rabia taking care of Bano so Hassan can see the goodness in her. He argues with Rabia, but Rabia insists that her love is truer than Bano's. Bano overhears this and interrupts them telling them that if they truly want to do something for her, they should get married. The next day, Hassan finds out that Bano has left the house. Hassan spends many days and weeks searching for Bano. He blames Rabia for this. Bano is living with a family where she does their household chores, she gets a job in a modern family where she realises that Pakistan is not how she thought it would be. She is fired from the job. One day Hassan sees her in the mosque and he runs after her to get her back home but Bano says her friend to go to Hassan and ask him to forget Bano. Hassan then goes home and agrees to marry Rabia as Bano had wished their marriage.
One day she goes to a birthday party where she meets a gentleman who has similar thoughts to those of Bano. He offers Bano to come and work in his office where they work for the welfare of people. Bano is very happy and accepts his proposal.

One day, Rabia learns of Bano's whereabouts and she begs her to marry Hassan. Eventually, Bano agrees and she promises that she will come. She goes to her office where the same gentleman leads her to storage room and attempts to abuse her, but she stabs hims to death. She is arrested by the police. Bano is taken to a mental asylum for recovery. Later, Hassan and Rabia, who are now husband and wife, visit Bano.

Cast
 Fawad Khan as Hassan
 Sanam Baloch as Bano (Sundar Kaur in Kapurthala)
 Mehreen Raheel as Rabia
 Ahsan Khan as Saleem; Bano's elder brother
 Saba Qamar as Suraiyyah; Saleem's wife
 Saba Hameed as Rasheeda; Hassan's mother
 Qavi Khan as Khwaja Naseer-ud-din; Bano's father
 Samina Peerzada as Saliha a.k.a. Bibi; Bano's mother
 Affan Waheed as Nadir; Hassan's friend
 Babrik Shah as Basant Singh/Basanta
 Seemi Raheel as Sakeena; Hassan's Maami
 Asma Abbas as Sultana; Rabia's mother
 Naeem Tahir as Rabia's Father
 Daniyal Raheel as Faheem; Bano's younger brother
 Anita Fatima Camphor as Jameela; Hassan's aunt
 Khayyam Sarhadi as Jameela's husband
 Humaira Ali as Kaamini
 Fawad Jalal as Laxman

Guest appearances
 Samina Ahmad as orphanage caretaker
 Shazia Afgan as Musarraut, Bano's friend
 Bilal Khan as social worker
 Sangeeta as Basanta's mother
 Nasreen Qureshi as Basanta's aunt
 Azra Mansoor as Musarrut's mother
 Farooq Zameer as Musarrut's father
 Kanwar Arsalan as a Carvan's leader
 Farah Tufail as Sikh villager

Soundtrack
The Dastaan theme "Aasmanon Se" was composed and sung by Sohail Haider and was written by Sahir Altaf. A frequent background music on the show, played during scenes asserting Pakistani independence or Pakistani pride is based after the tune of Aye Watan Pyare Watan by Ustad Amanat Ali Khan.

Production

Development and background
On being asked to choose Razia Butt’s novel Bano as an inspiration for serial Dastaan, Haissam Hussain revealed that about three years ago, he did a tele-film by Umera Ahmad, Mutthi Bhar Mitti which got a very good response, so Momina Duraid and he decided to work with the theme of partition and the novel Bano provided the perfect opportunity to pursue this.

The producer, Momina Duraid said that she read the novel Bano in her childhood and she want to make partition play but she was told that it is a failure to produce dramas on partition because nobody would watch it. She decided to make play on the novel Bano for which she met Razia Butt, the author of the novel who said to Duraid, "I am giving you the my precious thing, made it good."

Production locations
The serial takes place at a number of locations, primarily in Lahore. It starts out at a neighborhood of Lahore, which was shown as Ludhiana, India. The locations changed with every couple of episodes as the story corresponds. Other locations include Karachi, Rawalpindi, and Kapurthala. Notable locations include the Islamia College and the famous Badshahi Masjid in Lahore, as well as the Pakistan Railways Station. Location of this drama was being praised by the mass as it looked like of that time zone.

Release

International broadcast
Dastaan was aired in Middle East on MBC Bollywood under the title حب عبر الحدود. It was also aired in India on Zindagi under the title Waqt Ne Kiya Kya Haseen Sitam from 23 March 2015 onwards. Previously, it was decided to aired the show under the title Lakeerein, but the decision was later changed. In UK, the show was aired on Hum Europe premiering on September 19, 2015.

Home media and digital release
The show was available for online streaming on iflix from 2017 to 2019 and is also available on Indian streaming platform, Eros Now. Hum TV uploaded all the episodes of the series on official YouTube channel in May 2019.

Reception

Critical reception 
Dastaan was widely appreciated by the viewers and received positive reviews from critics due to its subject, genre, performances and direction. In a poll by Dawn, Dastaan was rated as the second best drama of 2010, after Dolly ki Ayegi Baraat, that aired on Geo Entertainment, and Sanam Baloch was voted best actress for Dastaan, with Mehreen Raheel in third place, while Samira Fazal was voted third best writer, also for Dastaan. It is also among the few dramas to have received 4.5 stars from TV Kahani. The review said: "Please, do yourself a favor and watch this one. You will learn and be entertained at the same time." The News International praised it to illustrate the minority representation sensitively.

DAWN Images ranked it as a most iconic TV drama of Pakistan, praising the direction and for balancing the historical details and political sensitivities.

Reaction from India
A notice was issued by Justice Mukul Mudgal against Zindagi on account of complaints received by the Indian Ministry of Broadcasting and Information. It stated that the show had depicted Indians in bad light.

Awards and nominations

References

External links
 
 Official website

2010 Pakistani television series debuts
2010 Pakistani television series endings
Pakistani drama television series
Urdu-language television shows
Hum TV original programming
Partition of India in fiction
Zee Zindagi original programming
Television shows set in the British Raj
Television shows set in Punjab, India
Sikhism in fiction
Pakistani period television series